Firozpur Lok Sabha constituency (formerly known as Ferozepur Lok Sabha constituency) is one of the 13 Lok Sabha constituencies in Punjab state in northern India.

Assembly segments
Presently, Firozpur Lok Sabha constituency comprises the following nine Vidhan Sabha (Legislative Assembly) segments:

Members of Parliament

Election results

See also
 Firozpur district
 List of Constituencies of the Lok Sabha
 Fazilka Lok Sabha constituency

Notes

Lok Sabha constituencies in Punjab, India
Firozpur district